The Girl from Barnhelm is a 1940 German historical comedy film directed by Hans Schweikart and starring Käthe Gold, Ewald Balser and Fita Benkhoff. It is an adaptation of the 1767 play Minna von Barnhelm by Gotthold Ephraim Lessing.

Cast

References

Bibliography

External links 
 

1940 films
Films of Nazi Germany
German historical comedy films
1940s historical comedy films
German films based on plays
Films set in the 1760s
Films set in Prussia
1940s German-language films
Films directed by Hans Schweikart
German black-and-white films
Bavaria Film films
1940 comedy films
1940s German films